Wietlina is a river of Poland. It is a branch of the Oder near Police.

0Wietlina
Rivers of Poland
Rivers of West Pomeranian Voivodeship